Squirrel Hollow County Park is located along the North Raccoon River southeast of Jefferson, Iowa, United States.  It was established in 1934, and it is the second oldest county park in the state of Iowa.  The  park is bordered on two sides by a  wildlife management area.  Both are managed by the Greene County Conservation Board.  They are open from April 1 to November 1 and feature facilities for camping, fishing, canoeing, kayaking, hiking, picnicking, and equestrian camping and trails.  The park was listed as a historic district on the National Register of Historic Places in 1991.

Historic district
Ten park structures are included in the historic district, of which three are contributing buildings and seven are contributing structures.  They were designed by the Central Design Office at Iowa State College, now Iowa State University, and built by the Civil Works Administration, Works Progress Administration, and the Public Works Administration between 1934 and 1936.  The three buildings are a shelter house and two latrines.  The  shelter house features old mill stones in the center of the concrete floor.  The structures include two fireplaces located east of the shelter house, the stone retaining wall on the east bank of the Raccoon River, two entrance portals along the county access road, a ball diamond, and the gravel road system.

References

Historic districts on the National Register of Historic Places in Iowa
Parks on the National Register of Historic Places in Iowa
County parks in Iowa
Protected areas of Greene County, Iowa
Public Works Administration in Iowa
Works Progress Administration in Iowa
National Register of Historic Places in Greene County, Iowa
Historic districts in Greene County, Iowa
1934 establishments in Iowa
Protected areas established in 1934
Civil Works Administration